Ali Haider  (1690-1785) was a Saraiki and Punjabi-language Sufi poet. He was born in Chountra village, Pir Mahal Tehsil, Toba Tek Singh District, Punjab in the year 1101 AH (1690). He spent almost his entire life in the village of his birth, where he died in 1785 at the age of 95.

References
 Great Sufi poets of The Punjab, by R M Chopra, Iran Society, Calcutta, 1999.

External links
http://www.dawn.com/2011/06/23/controversy-over-poet-ali-haider.html
http://www.wichaar.com/news/239/ARTICLE/7117/2008-05-18.html
http://archives.dawn.com/weekly/books/archive/041205/books2.htm
http://www.apnaorg.com/research-papers/nasir-rana-1/

1690 births
1785 deaths
People from Toba Tek Singh District
Punjabi-language poets
Punjabi people
Punjabi Sufis
18th-century Indian Muslims
18th-century Indian poets
Indian male poets